In Concert is a live album by American jazz pianist Ahmad Jamal featuring performances recorded in at Cannes, Palm Beach on January 26, 1981 and released on Personal Choice Records in 1981.

Reception

The Allmusic review awarded the album 4 stars, with Scott Yanow stating, "From the same concert that resulted in the Chiaroscuro LP Live In Concert, this worthy performance (still only available as an out-of-print LP) features the 1981 Ahmad Jamal Trio (consisting of the pianist/leader, bassist Sabu Adeyola and drummer Payton Crossley) stretching out on 'Morning of the Carnival' and Chick Corea's 'Tones for Joan's Bones.' The other three numbers ('One,' 'Bogata' and 'Autumn Leaves') add vibraphonist Gary Burton to the group, and the Burton-Jamal combination works quite well on what was a successful but only one-time collaboration."

References 

1981 live albums
Ahmad Jamal live albums